Fædrelandsvennen  is a regional newspaper based in Kristiansand, Norway. It  covers the southernmost part of the country, (Aust-Agder and Vest-Agder), focusing especially on the area between Mandal and Lillesand (west and east of Kristiansand).

History and profile
Fædrelandsvennen was established by Petrus Emilius Johanssen and Ole Christian Tangen in 1875. It is owned by the Norwegian based Schibsted ASA and has its headquarters in Kristiansand. Eivind Ljøstad was appointed editor-in-chief of the paper in 2010. 

It was Fædrelandsvennen which first reported on 29 December 1999 the relationship of Crown Prince of Norway with his future wife, Mette-Marit.

On 16 September 2006 Fædrelandsvennen was switched from broadsheet to tabloid format. On 14 May 2012, the newspaper introduced paid content for their online site—only subscribers can access the online newspaper in full.

Circulation
Fædrelandsvennen has 235 employees and has 116,000 daily readers.  
It is published six days per week.
The circulation of Fædrelandsvennen was 45,000 copies in 2003.
Confirmed circulation figures by Mediebedriftenes Landsforening (Newspaper Publishers' Association), Norway:
 2006: 42,642
 2007: 41,326
 2008: 40,729
 2009: 39,454
 2010: 37,934 
 2012: 35,441 
 2014: 34,065
 2015: 32,739

Notes

External links
www.fvn.no
Schibsted website

1875 establishments in Norway
Mass media in Kristiansand
Daily newspapers published in Norway
Norwegian-language newspapers
Newspapers established in 1875